Operation Spanner was a police investigation into same-sex male sadomasochism across the United Kingdom in the late 1980s. The investigation, led by the Obscene Publications Squad of the Metropolitan Police, began in 1987 and ran for three years, during which approximately 100 gay and bisexual men were questioned by police.

The investigation culminated in a report naming 43 individuals, of whom the Director of Public Prosecutions chose to prosecute 16 men for assault occasioning actual bodily harm, unlawful wounding and other offences related to consensual, private sadomasochistic sex sessions held in various locations between 1978 and 1987.

A resulting House of Lords judgement, R v Brown, ruled that consent was not a valid legal defence for actual bodily harm in Britain.

The case sparked a national conversation about the limits of consent and the role of government in sexual encounters between consenting adults. It also spawned two activist organisations dedicated to promoting the rights of sadomasochists: Countdown on Spanner and The Sexual Freedom Coalition,  and an annual SM Pride March through Central London. In 1996, Countdown on Spanner received the Large Nonprofit Organization of the Year award as part of the Pantheon of Leather Awards.

Background

Attitudes to homosexuality 
The 1980s was a period of rising negative sentiments towards homosexuality in Britain, peaking in 1987 when the British Social Attitudes Survey found that 75% of the population thought that homosexual activity was always or mostly wrong. That year, a high-profile public information campaign Don't Die of Ignorance saw the delivery of an educational leaflet about HIV/AIDS to every household in Britain. The association of gay and bisexual men with the AIDS pandemic worsened their stigmatisation.

The Conservative Party under the leadership of Margaret Thatcher made opposition to LGBT education a pillar of its 1987 general election campaign, issuing posters accusing the Labour Party of promoting the book Young, Gay and Proud in British schools. At that year's Conservative Party Conference, Thatcher warned that children were being taught "that they have an inalienable right to be gay".

Policing and the law 
In 1988, Section 28 of the Local Government Act prohibited local authorities from "intentionally promoting homosexuality". The measure received broad support from Conservative MPs including Peter Bruinvels, who commented that "Clause 28 will help outlaw [homosexuality] and the rest will be done by AIDS". In the years that followed, further legislation was proposed to discriminate against LGBT foster carers and to increase the penalties for cruising.

Although male homosexuality had been partially decriminalised in England and Wales in 1967, the offence of gross indecency was still widely used to criminalise sexual activity between men. An investigation by Gay Times found that police in England and Wales recorded 2,022 such offences in 1989, the highest rate since decriminalisation. That year, 30% of all convictions for sexual offences in England and Wales concerned consensual gay sex, with such prosecutions costing the government £12 million, and the resulting prison terms an estimated £5.5 million.

The Obscene Publications Squad 
The Obscene Publications Squad was a branch of the Metropolitan Police tasked with enforcing obscenity law, most notably the Obscene Publications Act 1959, which forbade the distribution of any article that "[tended] to deprave and corrupt" those who encountered it.

In 1976, following a three-year internal inquiry, it was revealed that the squad had been running a protection racket over the Soho sex industry for at least two decades, with Detective Superintendent William Moody alone receiving an estimated £25,000 a year in bribes. Prosecutors described a systemically corrupt organisation in which new recruits were coerced into attending 'Friday night shareouts', during which officers would be taken one by one into a store room at Scotland Yard and handed cash. Over the next two years, 13 officers were jailed, earning the Obscene Publications Squad its nickname: The Dirty Squad.

In the wake of the scandal, officers of the Obscene Publications Squad were limited to two years of service, later extended to three, in an effort to combat corruption. The reformed squad allied itself with the socially conservative campaign group National Viewers' and Listeners' Association and its controversial founder Mary Whitehouse, with the head of the squad becoming an annual speaker at Whitehouse's fringe meeting at the Conservative Party Conference throughout the late 1980s and early 1990s.

The squad gained significant notoriety during this period for its role in the 'video nasties' moral panic—during which its officers raided video rental shops and seized horror films such as Evil Dead II and The Driller Killer—as well as a crackdown on gay pornography. Its critics accused it of having a Christian fundamentalist agenda, while the Lesbian and Gay Policing Association said its activities "damaged relations" between the LGBT community and the police.

Investigation 
In October 1987, Greater Manchester Police acquired a videotape, codenamed 'KL7', depicting consensual sadomasochistic sexual activity between a group of men, including a sequence in which one man passed a nail through a piercing in another man's foreskin and hammered it into a block of wood, before making a series of incisions into the man's penis with a scalpel.

Greater Manchester Police launched an investigation into the KL7 tape and began looking for the men featured in the video. Their enquiries expanded as further tapes featuring whipping, spanking and wax play were seized, eventually leading to the involvement of sixteen police forces including West Mercia Police and West Yorkshire Police. A meeting was held to discuss the organisational structure of the expanded probe, and it was decided that the Obscene Publications Squad of the Metropolitan Police should lead the investigation, now called Operation Spanner.

On 4 November 1987, raids were carried out at the homes of men in Bolton, Shrewsbury and Shropshire. At the Shropshire address, sniffer dogs were taken around the property's garden, with police claiming to have reason to think that individuals may have been killed during the making of the tapes. Activists and defence lawyers later questioned the likelihood of the men's consensual home sex videos being mistaken for snuff films, leading Detective Superintendent Michael Hames of the Obscene Publications Squad to admit that he could not explain how such an error could have been made. Nonetheless, he later insisted, "such reckless and escalating violence, left unchecked, was bound to lead to someone getting killed".

Those interviewed during the raids described a loose knit circle of men who met through advertisements in gay contact magazines and gathered regularly in various locations for sadomasochistic sex sessions, some of which were recorded to video and shared among the group. Most cooperated fully with the police's enquiries, acknowledging their involvement in the group and identifying themselves on the seized tapes, unaware that they may have broken the law.

Further raids were carried out on 10 November in Pontypridd, where a large quantity of sadomasochistic paraphernalia was seized, and on 11 November in Birmingham. The same day, the offices of the gay magazine Sir were raided. Other contact magazines including Gay Galaxy and Corporal Contacts were also raided during the course of the investigation. Two further raids were carried out on 16 November, at homes in Welwyn Garden City and Hampstead.

That month, the first reports of the investigation appeared in the gay press. One man questioned by police in relation to Operation Spanner told Him magazine that officers were working from a diary seized during an earlier raid, and had mentioned snuff films in the course of their questioning. An officer with Greater Manchester Police denied that the operation was related to snuff films but went on to falsely speculate that the investigation may be connected to an unsolved 1985 murder in Leeds.

By the beginning of 1988, police still did not know the identities of the two men on the KL7 tape, despite having unknowingly interviewed the man who filmed the scene the previous November. Though no faces were visible on the tape, the Obscene Publications Squad attempted to identify one of the men by a distinctive joint deformity on the index finger of his left hand, distributing a still image of the finger to police forces across the UK.

On 29 March, an officer with Hampshire Constabulary reported that he had spotted the man on that week's episode of Panorama. Detectives consulted a recording of the episode and recognised their suspect in a sequence depicting a "special service of blessing" performed by a Church of England reverend for a gay couple. The man's joint deformity was visible in a close-up shot of his partner placing a ring onto his finger. A week later, on 7 April, police interviewed the man at a cafe in Evesham, and proceeded to search his home. He identified the other man on the KL7 tape, and a raid was carried out on that man's Broadway home the same day.

As the case began to come together, reporters were briefed that Operation Spanner "could be dealt with at the Old Bailey", prompting speculation that indictable-only offences would be brought against the men. The Obscene Publications Squad continued to build their case throughout 1989, even as the Metropolitan Police sought to replace the head of the squad, Detective Superintendent Leslie Bennett, after he was found to have used the Police National Computer to look up the license plate of his ex-wife's new partner.

Over the course of the investigation, in excess of 400 videotapes were seized, though a large number of these were commercial releases, and in some cases non-pornographic. The cost of the investigation was estimated at £2.5 million. Police were unable to find any participants who had not consented to the activities which took place, nor any who sustained lasting injuries.

In September 1989, sixteen men were charged with more than 100 offences including assault occasioning actual bodily harm and unlawful wounding. Several were charged with aiding and abetting assaults against themselves, charges which the Crown Prosecution Service said were "rare, except in cases where injuries were allegedly inflicted for a false insurance claim". In addition, one man was charged with bestiality and two were charged in relation to an indecent photograph of a child.

Trials

Magistrates' Court 
On 9 October 1989, the men appeared before Camberwell Magistrates' Court to face the charges against them. They were remanded to reappear at Lambeth Magistrates' Court on 20 November.

The charges brought against the men included conspiracy charges, which as indictable-only offences can only be heard in Crown Court, so the case was referred to the Old Bailey. The fact that these charges were later dropped led to accusations that the government viewed the trial as a test case, and intentionally sought to have it heard in Crown Court, where legal precedent could be set in the event of a guilty verdict.

Old Bailey 

The trial at the Old Bailey began on 29 October 1990 before Judge James Rant. The judge heard legal arguments from some of the accused that they could not be guilty because everyone involved had consented to what took place. However, Judge Rant rejected the argument and ruled that consent was not a defence, commenting that "people must sometimes be protected from themselves".

His decision relied heavily on R v Coney, an 1882 case in which participants in a bare-knuckle boxing match were found guilty of assault despite their consent to take part, and R v Donovan, a 1934 case in which a man was convicted of assault for caning a woman with her consent. After Judge Rant's ruling, the defendants changed their pleas to guilty, and were convicted on 7 November.

The remainder of the trial was dedicated to sentencing. Beginning on 11 December 1990, prosecutor Michael Worsley QC detailed the defendants' behaviour, which he characterised as "brute homosexual activity in sinister circumstances, about as far removed as can be imagined from the concept of human love". He explained that the state's evidence came not only from the men's own testimony, but also the many home videos seized during the investigation, though he conceded that these tapes had not been intended for distribution.

He described a group whose "nucleus" of key members "corrupted" others into attending "sessions of violence", where sadistic "masters" assaulted submissive "victims". Despite criticism that this framing misrepresented the nature of sadomasochism, his words were echoed in the press, with The Daily Telegraph branding the group a "torture vice gang" and The Times identifying the "leaders of [a] vicious and perverted sex gang".

Meanwhile, the defence argued for the consideration of a number of mitigating factors, including the fact that all those involved had consented to what took place, that they were all above the age of consent, and that none had at any time sought or required medical treatment.

Anna Worrall QC, representing one of the defendants, objected to a number of points raised by the prosecution, including the HIV status of some of the men, and the fact that police had taken sniffer dogs to the Shropshire raid, supposedly to search for buried bodies. She warned that "the world's press is listening to this" and that sensationalist reporting might "increase the punishment" of the defendants. Both details were indeed widely reported, with The Independent noting the men's HIV statuses in an article by Nick Cohen.

Also widely reported was Judge Rant's "horror" at having to watch the videotapes admitted into evidence. He requested an adjournment after going "white in the face" during one viewing, and responded to a question about a sequence from the KL7 tape by saying, "I am not likely to have forgotten that film. I don't think any of us is likely to forget that particular film".

At the end of the first day of the sentencing hearing, one of the defendants was hospitalised with broken wrists after allegedly being pushed to the ground and kicked by press photographers as he left the court.

Two days before Judge Rant was due to sentence the men, Detective Superintendent Michael Hames, head of the Obscene Publications Squad, published an article in the Daily Mail in which he called the defendants "the most horrific porn ring ever to appear before a British court". The National Campaign for the Reform of the Obscene Publications Acts called the article "heavily propagandist" and filed an official complaint against Hames.

On 19 December, Judge Rant sentenced the men, handing down eight prison sentences of between 12 months and  years. Passing the judgement, he said:

Court of Appeal 
Five of the defendants appealed to the Court of Appeal in February 1992. Three judges, headed by the Lord Chief Justice Lord Lane, upheld the men's convictions, ruling that their consent to the activities involved was "immaterial". However, Lord Lane acknowledged that the men did not appreciate that their acts were criminal, and therefore reduced five of the prison sentences handed down by Judge Rant, cutting the longest down to six months.

Lord Lane granted the men leave to appeal to the House of Lords, which at the time was the UK's highest court of appeal, saying there was a "general public importance" in settling the question of whether the prosecution must prove that a victim did not consent before it could obtain a conviction for assault or wounding.

House of Lords 

In March 1993, the five defendants appealed their case to the House of Lords. Ann Mallalieu QC, for the defence, argued that interfering in the private lives of consenting adults was justified only in cases where "private activity spills over into the public domain with adverse effects".

She went on to list several reasons why the case should not have been brought to trial, including the fact that no complaint was ever made to police, no serious or permanent injuries resulted from the activities, and participation in the acts was controlled, and limited to those wishing to take part.

The appeal was dismissed by a 3–2 majority of the Lords, with Lord Templeman declaring that:

European Court of Human Rights 

In February 1997, three of the defendants took their case before the European Court of Human Rights in Strasbourg, arguing that their convictions had violated their right to "respect for their private lives through the expression of their sexual personality" as guaranteed by Article 8 of the European Convention on Human Rights. In a landmark ruling, nine judges upheld that the laws under which the men were convicted were "necessary in a democratic society for the protection of health". The ruling followed pleas by the British government for the European Court to give greater consideration to individual nations' particular social mores.

Reaction and aftermath 
There was immediate criticism of the investigation and trial in 1990, with the Gay London Policing Group describing the sentences as "outrageous" and Andrew Puddephat, general secretary of Liberty, calling for a "right to privacy enshrined in law". Keir Starmer said the judiciary had "effectively imposed its morality on others" and argued the "unrepresentative make-up of the judiciary makes it ill-equipped to do this". The Pink Paper branded the case a homophobic "show trial" designed to "get a clear ruling on the illegality of S&M sex, especially amongst gay men".

On 16 February 1991, an estimated 5,000 people marched through Central London to protest the outcome of the Spanner trial, as well as the proposed Clause 25 of the Criminal Justice Bill, which would have raised the penalties for cruising and cottaging. On 13 April, thousands more protested the same issues at the Liberation '91 march in Manchester.

In August 1992, the campaign group Countdown on Spanner was formed in an effort to reverse the Court of Appeal ruling, and "demand the recognition that sadomasochism is a valid, sensual and legitimate part of human sexuality". The following month, it began publishing the newsletter Spanner People, and staged a public demonstration calling on Detective Superintendent Michael Hames, head of the Obscene Publications Squad, to resign. In 1996 Countdown on Spanner received the Large Nonprofit Organization of the Year award as part of the Pantheon of Leather Awards. 

On 28 November, the inaugural SM Pride parade was held, with more than 700 people marching through Central London.

In 1995, the Spanner Trust was established to provide assistance to the Spanner defendants, lobby for a change in British law to legalise sadomasochism, and provide assistance to any person subjected to discrimination because of their consensual sexual behaviour.

That December, following a public consultation, the Law Commission published 'Consent in the Criminal Law', a consultation paper which provisionally proposed the decriminalisation of consensual sadomasochistic acts, except in the case of 'seriously disabling injury'. This proposal was never adopted into law.

See also 
 Consensual crime
 Consent (criminal law)
 Victimless crime

Notes

External links 
The Spanner Trust
Lasting Marks, a short documentary on the case from The Guardian

Gay male BDSM
1993 in law
1987 in the United Kingdom
English criminal law
LGBT law in the United Kingdom
1987 in LGBT history
Law enforcement in England and Wales